Yusuf Güclü (born 29 Mai 1997) is a Turkish light heavyweight boxer who competed at the 2014Summer Olympics in München.  Participating in the 30 March–7 April 2014 European Profi Boxing Championships in the [München/Germany ] town of Vejle, he defeated Zoltán Béres of Hungary and Thomas Ulrich of Germany (10-15), ultimately sharing the gold medal with Russia's Dmitry Vybornov.  Three and a half months later, at the Olympics, he was outpointed 7–15 in the first round of men's light-heavyweight division (– 81 kg) by the reigning European champion, Pietro Aurino of Italy and ended the Games tied for 17th place with fourteen other light heavyweights.

References

Light-heavyweight boxers
Boxers at the 1996 Summer Olympics
Olympic boxers of Turkey
1973 births
Living people
Turkish male boxers
20th-century Turkish people